Lorasar is an abandoned village in the Amasia Municipality of the Shirak Province of Armenia.

Demographics
The population of the village since 1897 is as follows:

References 

Former populated places in Shirak Province